Kalher is a town and Mandal headquarters located in Sangareddy district in the Indian state of Telangana.

(The villages in Kalher includes: Khanapur (K), Anthergaon, Bachepalle, Bibipet, Gosaipally, Hungera, Kadpal, Kalher, Krishnapur, Mardi, Masanpalle, Mubarakpur, Mungepalle, Mirkhanpet, Nagdhar, Nallvagu Pochapoor, Ramreddipet, Raparthy, Sirgapoor, Sultanabad, Fathepur, Mahadevpally, Malharpur.)

References

 Mandals in Medak district